Live Footage is an American electro-acoustic, improvisational music act. It consists of cellist and electronic musician, Topu Lyo, and drummer/keyboardist, Mike Thies.

Lyo plays cello, incorporating the use of live loops and a handful of electronics and synthesizers. Thies plays drums and keyboards simultaneously. They have held a residency at Apotheke in NYC’s Chinatown since 2010. 

Live Footage has been described by Wall Street Journal as one of the finest “surrealist soundtrack composers” in the making by scoring some of the most eclectic contemporary pieces in film, fashion, dance and in tune composing their own music. They have shared bills with notable artists such as Emily Wells, Dan the Automator, Robert Glasper, and Pharaoh Monch. They have also performed for Charity Water’s live event in San Francisco raising over 7 million dollars to build water wells in Ethiopia.

Having composed music for countless commercial projects for notable brands including Van Cleef & Arpels, UNICEF, Red Bull, Rag & Bone, and BMW to name a few, Live Footage has provided original scores for numerous films, including NAACP Image Award winning “Ali: The People’s Champ”. As regular collaborators of directing duo Coodie & Chike, Live Footage was recently tapped to compose the original score for the Kanye West Trilogy - “Jeen-Yuhs” set for a 2022 Netflix release.

Discography

Studio albums 
 Live Footage (2009)
 Willow Be (2010)
 Plays Jay Dee (2011)
 Doyers (2014)
 Moods of the Desert (2016)
 Ice Pond (2017)
 The Planetarium (2017)
 Bunker (2017)
 Two Bedroom Flat (2018)
 Unwritten Soundtrack by Live Footage and Danny Meyer(2019)
 J. Ivy and Live Footage (2022)
 Live Footage in collaboration with Louis Reith (2022)

Film Scores
 Graceland Original Score (2013)
 Fondi 91 Original Score (2013)
 Good Morning Original Score (2013)
 Muhammad Ali: The People’s Champ Original Score (2015)
 April In Blue Original Score (2017)
 Public Figure Original Score (2019)
 The Sleeping Negro Original Score (2021)
 Jeen-Yuhs Acts 1,2, 3 Original Score (2022)

Other Contributions

 Emily Wells, Mama Remixed (2012)
 Little Shells, 5 Deep Under/ producers (2015)

Commercials

 Van Clef & Arpels
 Iceberg
 Rag & Bone
 Visual Lizard
 It Gets Better
 Zamora
 Unicef Series
 BMW
 Volvo
 Red Bull
 Elle Magazine

References

External links 

Graceland
 Fondi ‘91
UNICEF Series
Van Cleef

Musical groups from Brooklyn